The FIBA Americas Under-20 Women's Championship was the Americas basketball championship for women under 20 years that was played every four years. In the 2002 edition, the championship was played by under-21 teams. The Under-20 format became defunct after the 2006 edition.

Summaries

Participation details

External links
 USA history

Recurring sporting events established in 2002
Women's basketball competitions in the Americas between national teams